William French may refer to:

 William H. French (1815–1881), Union general in the American Civil War
 Percy French (William Percy French, 1854–1920), Irish entertainer and artist
 William French (educator) (1786–1849), master of Jesus College, Cambridge
 William French (priest) (1704–1785), Irish Anglican priest, Dean of Ardagh 
 William French (archdeacon) (1739–1790), Irish Anglican priest, Archdeacon of Kilfenora 
 William French (merchant) (1732–1802)
 William Aden French (1892–1980), American newspaper publisher and author
 William M. R. French (1843–1914), director of the Art Institute of Chicago
 Bill French (baseball) (William Henry French, 1849–1893), American baseball player
 Bill French (footballer) (William Thomas Hunter French, 1884–1972), Australian rules footballer

See also
 Westminster massacre, Vermont, 1775, whose first victim was William French